Sept-Rivières—Caniapiscau is a census division (CD) of Quebec, with geographical code 97. It consists of the regional county municipalities of Sept-Rivières and Caniapiscau.

The division had a population of 39,500 in the Canada 2011 Census. Of that total, 25,686 people, 65 per cent of the division's entire population, reside in the city of Sept-Îles.

Geographic hierarchy

In the second column:
 S = belongs to Sept-Rivières RCM juridically
 s = belongs to Sept-Rivières RCM geographically
 C = belongs to Caniapiscau RCM juridically
 c = belongs to Caniapiscau RCM geographically

In the rightmost column, summed up area adds up to 100858.55 rather than the correct 100858.53 due to rounding error.

References

Census divisions of Quebec